LaGrange District Schoolhouse is a historic one-room school located at Freedom Plains, Dutchess County, New York.  It was built about 1862, and is a one-story, rectangular frame building sheathed in clapboard.  It has a front gable roof and sits on a stone foundation.  It ceased operation as a school in 1942, and subsequently housed a local public library in the 1970s, and is now a local history museum.

It was added to the National Register of Historic Places in 2013.

See also

National Register of Historic Places listings in Dutchess County, New York

References 

History museums in New York (state)
One-room schoolhouses in New York (state)
School buildings on the National Register of Historic Places in New York (state)
School buildings completed in 1862
Schools in Dutchess County, New York
National Register of Historic Places in Dutchess County, New York